The Movement for National Reform is a moderate Islamist political party in Algeria. It received 9.5% of the vote in the 2002 elections and received 43 members of parliament.

The party was created as a breakout faction from the Ennahda movement, after that party opted for cooperation with Algeria's government. Party leader Abdallah Djaballah then left to found and lead the more radically oppositional el-Islah.

At the 2007 elections, the party was badly defeated. It received only 2.53% of the vote and 3 seats.

References

1999 establishments in Algeria
Islamic political parties in Algeria
Islamism in Algeria
Political parties established in 1999
Political parties in Algeria